Emma José Townsend (1869 – 8 March 1965) was a British recipient of the Empire Gallantry Medal.

Born in Leicester in 1869, Miss Townsend moved to Devon in 1926 together with her two sisters.  In May 1932, one of her sisters, Elizabeth, was seriously ill in Kingsbridge Cottage Hospital. On 7 May, Emma was visiting her when she heard screaming from the next ward.  One of the patients in the next ward was nine-year old William Yeoman, who was being assaulted by his father, William Jarvis Yeoman.  Mr Yeoman had arrived at the hospital with a shotgun concealed under a coat with the intention of shooting his son. He was interrupted by a nurse but managed to fire at his son before striking him with the gun; it was the boy's screams that Emma Townsend had heard. Without hesitation, Townsend attempted to disarm Yeoman but each time she tried, he pushed her aside, on one occasion striking her with the gun, causing a scalp wound.  Yeoman eventually broke away and ran from the hospital.

Yeoman was captured by the police some hours later, but in the meantime had murdered his wife and other two children. William died two days later from injuries inflicted during the assault. Emma Townsend was treated for the head wound and later discharged.

Yeoman was charged with the murders of his family and the attempted murder of Emma Townsend. He was tried at Devon Assizes in June 1932 and found guilty but insane; he was ordered to be detained during His Majesty's pleasure.  Giving evidence, Miss Townsend described her actions by saying, "I did my best". The trial judge, Mr Justice Charles, responded, "I think you acted with great courage".

On 6 September 1932, the award of the Empire Gallantry Medal to Emma Townsend was published in the London Gazette.  The citation ran:

In subsequent interviews, Miss Townsend maintained that she did no more than anyone else would have done in the circumstances. She was reluctant to talk about the incident as her sister had died only a few days afterwards.

Like all recipients of the Empire Gallantry Medal, Miss Townsend's medal was exchanged for the George Cross after its introduction in 1940.  Miss Townsend was one of four women to be awarded the Empire Gallantry Medal.

References

Notes

Sources
 
 

Recipients of the Empire Gallantry Medal
People from Leicester
1869 births
1965 deaths